Indian Wells is a former settlement in Imperial County, California.

Indian Wells was a watering place between two Lagunas on the New River found by the Kearny and Cooke Expediditons in 1846.  They were subsequently used from the time of the California Gold Rush as a watering place on the Southern Emigrant Trail crossing the Colorado Desert.  Its location is described by the 1854-55 Railroad Expedition report:

From Sackett's to the Colorado river the desert appears to the unaided eye a perfect level, but it is shown to be undulating, and composed of several gentle slopes or swells of surface rising to a level terrace in the vicinity of Alamo Mocho. The two "lagoons" on the desert being now dry, water is obtained from a well dug in the channel which connects them, at a point about half way between, and 14.5 miles from Sackett's. This watering place is known by the name of "Indian Wells." The water is at a depth of about 30 feet, and is of tolerable quality. From here to Alamo Mocho is a stretch of 20 miles without water, over a surface generally even and free of obstructions."

Indian Wells was a stop on the Butterfield Overland Stage line. The site of Indian Wells was obliterated by the 1906 flood of the New River, when the Colorado River changed course and filled the Salton Sea, scouring a deeper and wider channel for the New River.

References

External links
 View of the Indian Wells Stagecoach station, (ca. 1936) 1931/1941, San Diego History Center (formerly San Diego Historical Society) from calisphere.org.  Photo of the ruin of the Indian Wells Stage Station taken by persons unknown obtained by the Society between 1931 and 1941 but it must have been taken before the 1906 flood of the New River.

Former settlements in Imperial County, California
Former populated places in California
San Antonio–San Diego Mail Line
Butterfield Overland Mail in California
American frontier
Stagecoach stops in the United States